Rogério Miguel Puga (born 1974) holds a PhD in Anglo-Portuguese Studies (NOVA FCSH), was a lecturer at Institute of Education and Sciences, (ISEC, Lisbon, 2000–2005), assistant professor at the University of Macau (2007–2009) and a senior researcher at the Centre for English, Translation and Anglo-Portuguese Studies (CETAPS, NOVA University Lisbon). He is associate professor at the Faculty of Social and Human Sciences of NOVA University Lisbon. He is a research collaborator at Centre for the Humanities (CHAM, NOVA University Lisbon) and the Centre for Comparative Studies (University of Lisbon). He is a subject editor for the journal Romance Studies, and member of the editorial board of Anais de História de Além-Mar (Print: ,) and Revista de Estudos Anglo-Portugueses (Print: ,).

Publications
He has published several studies on Anglo-Portuguese literary and historical relations, the Portuguese and British empires, and on Lusophone and Anglophone literatures, including:

References

1974 births
21st-century Portuguese writers
Living people
NOVA University Lisbon alumni
Academic staff of NOVA University Lisbon
Portuguese male writers
Portuguese translators